Daughter of Shanghai is a 1937 American crime film directed by Robert Florey and starring Anna May Wong. Unusually for the time, East Asian American actors played the lead roles. It was also one of the first films in which Anthony Quinn appeared. In 2006, Daughter of Shanghai was included in the annual selection of 25 motion pictures to be added to the National Film Registry of the Library of Congress.

Plot
Lan Ying Lin and government agent Kim Lee battle alien smugglers.

Cast
 Anna May Wong as Lan Ying Lin
 Charles Bickford as Otto Hartman
 Buster Crabbe as Andrew Sleete (as Larry Crabbe)
 Cecil Cunningham as Mrs. Mary Hunt
 J. Carrol Naish as Frank Barden
 Anthony Quinn as Harry Morgan
 John Patterson as James Lang 
 Evelyn Brent as Olga Derey
 Philip Ahn as Kim Lee
 Fred Kohler as Captain Gulner
 Guy Bates Post as Lloyd Burkett
 Virginia Dabney as Rita - a Dancer

Analysis

Daughter of Shanghai is unique among 1930s Hollywood features for its portrayal of an Asian-focused theme with two prominent Asian-American performers as leads. This was truly unusual in a time when white actors typically played Asian characters in the cinema. At best, Hollywood assigned some Asian roles to Asian performers and some to white stars in the same film, with results that seem discordant today even if widely accepted at the time. Daughter of Shanghai was prepared as a vehicle for Anna May Wong, the first Asian-American woman to become a star of the Hollywood cinema. Appearing in some 60 movies during her life, she was a top billed player for over twenty years, working not only in Hollywood, but also in England and Germany. In addition, she was a star of the stage and a frequent guest performer on radio, and would headline the first American television series concentrating on an Asian character, The Gallery of Madame Liu-Tsong (DuMont, 1951).

Reception

Contemporaneous

On its release, on December 17, 1937, The New York Times gave the film a generally positive review, commenting of its B-movie origins, "An unusually competent cast saves the film from the worst consequences of certain inevitable banalities. [The cast]... combine with effective sets to reduce the natural odds against any pictures in the Daughter of Shanghai tradition."

Modern
The film has received critical acclaim from modern day critics. The review aggregator Rotten Tomatoes reports that 95% of critics gave the film a positive review based on 20 reviews. Critics near universally praised the performances of the lead actors Philip Ahn and especially Anna May Wong.

In 2006, the film was selected for preservation in the United States National Film Registry by the Library of Congress as being "culturally, historically, or aesthetically significant". In a press release, the Library of Congress said:

"B-films during the studio era often resonate decades later because they explore issues and themes not found in higher-budget pictures. Robert Florey, widely acclaimed as the best director working in major studio B-films during this period, crafted an intriguing, taut thriller. Anna May Wong overcame Hollywood's practice at the time of casting white actors to play Asian roles and became its first, and a leading, Asian-American movie star in the 1920s through the late 1930s. Daughter of Shanghai was more truly Wong's personal vehicle than any of her other films. In the story she uncovers the smuggling of illegal aliens through San Francisco’s Chinatown, cooperating with costar Philip Ahn as the first Asian G-man of the American cinema."

References

Bibliography

External links
 Daughter of Shanghai essay by Brian Taves at National Film Registry 
 Daughter of Shanghai essay  by Daniel Eagan in America's Film Legacy: The Authoritative Guide to the Landmark Movies in the National Film Registry, A&C Black, 2010 , pages 270-271 
 
 
 
 

1937 films
1937 crime films
Films about Chinese Americans
American black-and-white films
1930s English-language films
Paramount Pictures films
United States National Film Registry films
Films directed by Robert Florey
American crime films
1930s American films